Brat is the fourth studio album by American musician Nnamdi. It was released on April 3, 2020 through Sooper Records.

Track listing

Personnel 
 Macie Stewart & Augustine Esterhammer-Fic - Strings on Tracks 1 & 7 
 Mallory Linehan - Strings on Track 3 
 Amanda Bailey & Victoria Lee - Strings on Tracks 4 & 12 
 Julia Steiner - Bridge vocals on Track 5 
 Connor Bernhard & Sen Morimoto - Horns on Track 7 
 Collin Clauson - End synth on Track 8 

Production

 Written, produced, and recorded by NNAMDI
 Mixed by Steve Marek
 Mastered by Dan Millice
 Track 11 co-produced by Conor Mackey

References 

2020 albums